Sawyer is an unincorporated community in Yakima County, Washington, United States.

Sawyer was founded in 1911 and was named after William Perry Sawyer by the North Yakima and Valley Railway Company. The town site, primarily a rural railroad junction, was acquired from William Perry Sawyer by the railroad and was platted in 1931 by several companies including the  First Security and Loan Company, the Yakima Fruit Growers Association and the William Sawyer Fruit Company. Sawyer is located near the city of Wapato and is mostly an agricultural community.

References

Northern Pacific Railway
Unincorporated communities in Yakima County, Washington
Unincorporated communities in Washington (state)